Warning Sign is a 1985 American science fiction-horror film directed by Hal Barwood and starring Sam Waterston, Kathleen Quinlan, Yaphet Kotto, Jeffrey DeMunn, and Richard Dysart.

Plot

In a secret military laboratory operating under the guise of a pesticide manufacturer, there is an outbreak of a virulent bacteria. During routine work, a sealed tube is broken, releasing the secret biological weapon. Detecting the release of the weapon, Joanie Morse, the plant's security officer, activates "Protocol One," a procedure sealing all of the workers inside from the outside world.

Tom Schmidt believing the cause for the lock down to be a pump malfunction, with another worker, Bob, restart the pump. After several moments of being unable to contact Dr. Nielsen in the biohazard P4 lab, Dr. Nielsen contacts Security, confirms "Protocol One", and advises Security to open the safe and contact USACT, the U.S. government's Accident Containment Team, to deal with the problem.

Cal Morse, a local County Sheriff whose wife, the security officer, is trapped inside, is advised to retain the help of Dr. Dan Fairchild, a past employee who is a known alcoholic, who created an antidote to the weapon.  Vic Flint, frustrated over the quarantine of his son Bob, attempts to shoot his way in.  Fearing someone being shot accidentally, Cal confiscates his .357 magnum revolver when the bullet ricocheted off the steel blast doors.

USACT led by Major Connelly arrives, sets up quarantine procedures (including of 3 workers who left early before the "Protocol One" was activated; Bob's girlfriend Dana being one of them). The 3 workers are sealed inside plastic "bubbles" for the duration of the film but expect to be in them for 3 days. Connelly appeases the public with the cover story of a contamination of experimental yeast while a rescue team enters the facility to retrieve the antidote and administer it to the workers.

Upon the release of the weapon, the P4 lab workers sanitize the area, destroy lab animals, and inoculate themselves with the antidote. Hours later, the USACT team locate Dr. Nielsen and his team incapacitated on the floor near the P4 lab air lock. A short time later, they notice the bodies have disappeared, the air lock smashed open from inside, and a power outage from inside the building caused by Dr. Ramesh Kapoor, a P4 worker, by destroying a power box with a fire axe.

A group of workers—including Bob, Schmidt, and Tippett—believe themselves to be unaffected and want to leave, despite the "Protocol One" quarantine. Unbeknownst to the workers, they became infected by the breach of the P4 air lock, the bypassed pump circulating contaminated air throughout the building, and Schmidt's contact lens contaminating the building with the weapon.  The Security officer destroyed the piece of paper containing the code to deactivate the lockdown, but remembered the code. The group, now led by Tippett, torture her for the code, which is discovered to be invalidated once USACT tapped into the system.

While inside the building, the rescue team encounters this group of workers. The rescue team order the group to remain under quarantine; Tippett is shot dead when he refuses. The rest are placed in a room to await inoculation when the rescue team returns with the antidote.

Dr. Fairchild directs the rescue team into an unoccupied service conduit as a direct way to the P4 lab. The rescue team encounters Dr. Nielsen.  Suspecting something to be wrong, Fairchild directs the rescue team to retreat, leaving Dr. Nielsen behind. The rescue team are ambushed and murdered by the P4 workers, one of which is murdered by Dr. Kapoor with the fire axe. Despite being inoculated, the antidote didn't work; suffering from the effects of the weapon, all of the infected workers become enraged,  blood-thirsty homicidal maniacs.  They are lucid in thought yet deranged in their intentions, most notably Dr. Nielsen.  According to a history remembered by Dr. Fairchild, the biological weapon that they are seeing in action was one synthesized from a virus found in the dead bodies of horses who had attacked each other to death.  The virus was found to produce violent, psychotic rage.

Upon the death of the rescue team, USACT activates "Protocol Two", leaving all employees to await the deadly effects of the weapon and sanitize the location afterwards. Hearing this, Cal urges Dr. Fairchild to assist him in retrieving the antidote, stopping the contagion, and saving his wife. As Cal and Dr. Fairchild enter the facility, they encounter an infected Bob, armed with a fire axe. When he tries to attack, he is shot dead by Cal armed with his father, Vic Flint's, confiscated .357 magnum revolver.

As most of the workers succumb to their infections, Schmidt realizes that somehow Joanie is unaffected. He pleads with her to go to the P4 lab to retrieve the antidote. As they make their way, they encounter Dr. Nielsen who wants to contain the knowledge of the incident and Dr. Kapoor who wants to kill them. They escape the attack using a fire extinguisher and descend in the elevator to the P4 lab.

While in the P4 lab, Schmidt succumbs to his infection. Untreated, he becomes enraged as the P4 workers hunt them down. Joanie retrieves the antidote and makes her escape while Schmidt attacks the P4 workers, breaking Dr. Kapoor's neck before being thrown through a window and killed by the P4 workers.

In the hallway, Joanie encounters Cal and Fairchild. They repel a group of workers attacking them, but not before ripping Fairchild's biohazard suit, exposing him. They sneak into the P4 lab to find out why Joanie is unaffected while the antidote didn't work. A test discovers her blood is full of estrogen, progesterone, and antibodies; she is pregnant. As several workers attempt to enter P4 to attack the trio, they are set on fire by booby traps. One worker is able to rip Cal's biohazard suit before being set on fire by Joanie throwing a Molotov cocktail at her.

Before being incapacitated by his infection, Dr. Fairchild enters a recipe for a new antidote into a nearby computer: 1 part hormones, 2 parts antidote, and 1/2 part thorazine (to make the patient sleep while the other drugs take effect). Using Fairchild as a guinea pig, they try out the new hormone-based antidote on him; it works.

Armed with a new sidearm, inoculation injection guns, Cal and Fairchild make their way to the cafeteria where the workers discovered a group that was sealed inside and therefore not affected by the virus. Cal and Fairchild inoculate infected workers that begin attacking them while Joanie takes a batch of the new antidote to the building's decontamination system.  Dr. Nielsen, refusing to be injected, flees back to the P4 lab.  Celebrating their success, Fairchild reveals their new antidote works.  Realizing his failure, Dr. Nielsen commits suicide with the .357 magnum revolver Cal left behind.

Joanie succeeds in locating the decontamination system. She administers the new antidote throughout the building, eradicating the weapon and treating workers breathing in the aerosolized antidote.  Upon confirmation the infection levels are down, Joanie deactivates the "Protocol One" quarantine and Fairchild inoculates Cal, rendering him unconscious.

The crisis over, USACT evacuates the victims, retrieves the dead, seals the building, and congratulates Dr. Fairchild on his success and assistance. Upon waking up, Cal nails a "Building Condemned: DO NOT ENTER" sign on the entrance. Dr. Fairchild invites Cal and Joanie back to his home for breakfast - Zucchini pancakes and genetically grown corn on the cob.

Cast

Production
Parts of the film were shot in Payson, Utah.

Reception
Warning Sign has an approval rating of 20% on Rotten Tomatoes, based on 10 reviews.

Rick Kogan of the Chicago Tribune wrote: "Warning Sign fails to deliver any substantive messages or any genuine thrills."

The original title was Biohazard, which tested poorly with preview audiences, and the film was retitled but used the biohazard sign on the poster.

References

External links
 
 
 

1985 films
1985 horror films
1980s science fiction horror films
20th Century Fox films
American science fiction horror films
Films about viral outbreaks
Films scored by Craig Safan
Films shot in Utah
Films with screenplays by Matthew Robbins
1985 directorial debut films
1980s English-language films
1980s American films